Hutchinsonia is a genus of flowering plants in the family Rubiaceae. It was described by Walter Robyns in 1928 and was named after his friend and colleague John Hutchinson. It is found in west tropical Africa.

Species
 Hutchinsonia barbata Robyns
 Hutchinsonia glabrescens Robyns

References

External links
World Checklist of Rubiaceae

Rubiaceae genera
Vanguerieae